Yellowcress is a common name for several plants:

Nasturtium, a genus in the family Brassicaceae
Rorippa, a genus in the family Brassicaceae
Rorippa palustris